St. Xavier's College Ahmedabad (SXCA) is a Christian minority institution of higher education in Ahmedabad, Gujarat, India. It was founded in 1955 by the Gujarat Jesuits of the Society of Jesus (Jesuits) and is the only grant-in-aid Christian college in Ahmedabad. It is still run by the Jesuits.

Accreditation and rankings
In 2001, the National Assessment and Accreditation Council (NAAC) accredited SXCA with five stars. In 2007, NAAC reaccredited SXCA with A+ and in 2013
}NAAC reaccredited SXCA with A (CGPA 3.41).
In 2019, SXCA received first rank in the Gujarat State Institutional Rating Framework (GSIRF) among colleges, but fell to second in 2020, receiving five stars on each occasion.

The National Institutional Ranking Framework Ranking (National Level) placed SXCA in 2018 in the 65th, in 2019 in the 56th,

St. Xavier's College (Autonomous) has been ranked among the top 50 colleges consistently by 
India Today rankings and other frameworks at the national level and the first rank at the 
city and state levels. The India today's ranking are given below.

Academics 
The college offers courses at the undergraduate and postgraduate levels.

Undergraduate courses
Bachelor of Arts

Economics
English
Gujarati.
Psychology
Sanskrit

Bachelor of Commerce

Bachelor of Computer Applications

Bachelor of Science
Biochemistry
Biotechnology
Botany
Computer Science
Chemistry
Electronics
Mathematics
Physics
Statistics
Zoology

Postgraduate courses

Master of Arts
English
Psychology
Master of Science
Analytical Chemistry
Big Data Analytics
Biotechnology 
Biochemistry
Mathematics
Organic Chemistry
Physics

Notable alumni
 Parveen Babi - actress
 Rajeev Khandelwal - actor
 Rita Kothari - author
 Geet Sethi - billiards player
 Saroop Dhruv - poet
 Rohit Roy - actor
Deeksha Joshi - actress

See also
 List of Jesuit educational institutions

References  

Colleges affiliated to Gujarat University
Universities and colleges in Ahmedabad
Jesuit universities and colleges in India
Educational institutions established in 1955
1955 establishments in Bombay State
Arts colleges in India
Commerce colleges in India
Science colleges in India